Rock County is a county at the southwestern corner of the U.S. state of Minnesota. As of the 2020 census, the population was 9,704. Its county seat is Luverne.

History
The county was formed on May 23, 1857, by act of the territorial legislature, but was not organized at that time. The area was designated Pipestone County, and the name Rock County was attached to the present Pipestone. In 1862 the Minnesota state legislature changed the designations, attaching the present names to the present counties. On March 5, 1870, the state legislature approved an act that finalized the county's organization and designated Luverne as the county seat. The county's name came from the Rock River, which in turn is named for a prominent rocky outcrop (designated "The Rock" on an 1843 map of the area) of reddish-gray quartzite, about 3 miles (5 km) north of Luverne. The mound dramatically contrasts with the low surrounding prairie. Another source attributes the county name to its rocky soil.

Geography
Rock County lies at Minnesota's southwest corner. Its western border abuts South Dakota's eastern border; its southern border abuts Iowa's northern border. The Rock River flows southward through the east central part of the county, and Beaver Creek flows southward through the west central part of the county. The county consists of low rolling hills carved with drainages. The area is devoted to agriculture. The terrain slopes to the south, with its highest point near the midpoint of its north boundary, at 1,759' (536m) ASL. The entire county falls in the hot summer humid continental climate zone (Dfa).

Lakes
One of Minnesota's nicknames is "Land of 10,000 Lakes", and it is speckled with bodies of water large and small. But four of the state's counties do not contain a natural lake; Rock County is one of them. Rock County did host a manmade lake from 1938 until 2014: a WPA work project constructed a small dam (the "Lower Dam") on Blue Mounds Creek in 1938, creating a small lake in Blue Mounds State Park. This continued until June 2014, when the dam was damaged by rain and floodwaters, allowing the pond to drain. In June 2016 the Minnesota Department of Natural Resources announced its decision not to rebuild the dam.

Major highways

  Interstate 90
  U.S. Highway 75
  Minnesota State Highway 23
  Minnesota State Highway 269
  Minnesota State Highway 270

Adjacent counties

 Pipestone County – north
 Murray County – northeast
 Nobles County – east
 Lyon County, Iowa – south
 Minnehaha County, South Dakota – west
 Moody County, South Dakota – northwest

Protected areas
 Blue Mounds State Park
 Northern Tallgrass Prairie National Wildlife Refuge (part)

Demographics

2020 census

Note: the US Census treats Hispanic/Latino as an ethnic category. This table excludes Latinos from the racial categories and assigns them to a separate category. Hispanics/Latinos can be of any race.

2000 census
As of the 2000 census, there were 9,721 people, 3,843 households, and 2,705 families in the county. The population density was 20.2/sq. mi. (7.79/km2). There were 4,137 housing units at an average density of 8.58/sqmi (3.31/km2). The racial makeup of the county was 97.27% White, 0.53% Black or African American, 0.43% Native American, 0.62% Asian, 0.02% Pacific Islander, 0.53% from other races, and 0.59% from two or more races. 1.28% of the population were Hispanic or Latino of any race. 41.4% were of German, 23.8% Dutch and 16.5% Norwegian ancestry.

There were 3,843 households, out of which 31.30% had children under the age of 18 living with them, 62.10% were married couples living together, 5.50% had a female householder with no husband present, and 29.60% were non-families. 27.00% of all households were made up of individuals, and 15.70% had someone living alone who was 65 years of age or older. The average household size was 2.47 and the average family size was 3.01.

The county population contained 26.30% under the age of 18, 7.20% from 18 to 24, 24.10% from 25 to 44, 22.00% from 45 to 64, and 20.40% who were 65 years of age or older. The median age was 40 years. For every 100 females there were 97.60 males. For every 100 females age 18 and over, there were 93.00 males.

The median income for a household in the county was $38,102, and the median income for a family was $44,296. Males had a median income of $28,776 versus $22,166 for females. The per capita income for the county was $17,411. About 5.50% of families and 8.00% of the population were below the poverty line, including 8.10% of those under age 18 and 8.90% of those age 65 or over.

Communities

Cities

 Beaver Creek
 Hardwick
 Hills
 Jasper (part)
 Kenneth
 Luverne (county seat)
 Magnolia
 Steen

Unincorporated communities
 Ash Creek
 Kanaranzi
 Manley

Ghost towns
 Bruce
 Carnegie

Townships

 Battle Plain Township
 Beaver Creek Township
 Clinton Township
 Denver Township
 Kanaranzi Township
 Luverne Township
 Magnolia Township
 Martin Township
 Mound Township
 Rose Dell Township
 Springwater Township
 Vienna Township

In popular culture
Much of the second season of Fargo is set in Luverne and Rock County.

Government and politics

National politics
Rock County traditionally votes Republican. In no presidential election since 1964 has it selected the Democratic candidate. It and Pipestone County were the only Minnesota counties Amy Klobuchar did not win in her 2012 Senate race.

See also
 National Register of Historic Places listings in Rock County, Minnesota

References

External links
 Rock County government website
 The Rock County Star Herald newspaper website
 Vanished Towns of Rock County

 
Minnesota counties
1870 establishments in Minnesota
Populated places established in 1870